Shane Fenton and the Fentones were an English rock and roll group formed in 1960. Shane Fenton, the band's namesake, was actually the stage name of two different musicians; when the first Shane Fenton, real name Johnny Theakston, suddenly died, he was replaced by Bernard Jewry who assumed the Shane Fenton identity. They had four top 40 hits with Jewry as their lead singer. Jewry would later find fame as Alvin Stardust.

History

Beginnings: Johnny Theakston as Shane Fenton
The original lead singer of the group was Johnny Theakston who was born in 1944. When Theakston was a child, he contracted rheumatic fever. Prior to playing rock'n roll, Theakston was playing skiffle. When the popularity of that genre faded, he switched to the more popular one.

The group's roots can be traced to the Diamond Skiffle Group and Roger Lymer and his Crusaders. Following the break up of the two groups, some members from each of them ended up in a group called Johnny Theakston with his Beat Boys. The group's name was  changed to Johnny Theakston and the Tremeloes. In the late 1950s, the newly named group took part in, and won a talent show at the Mansfield Palais. Also at the show was a young Bernard Jewry. He would then join Johnny Theakston and The Tremeloes as their roadie. Occasionally Jewry would perform with them on stage. By 1960 Johnny Theakston decided that the group needed a more commercial name. He had given himself a more American image and adopted the name Shane Fenton. The Shane part was from the western, Shane. The Fenton part came from a local printing firm. The group had been doing well in the Nottinghamshire area, attracting more attention as they continued playing.

The group recorded a demo tape around 1961 which was sent to BBC. At the time the group consisted of Johnny Theakston on vocals, Jerry Wilcock and Mick Eyre on lead and rhythm guitars, Graham Squires on bass and Tony Hinchcliffe on drums. As a result of the tape being heard, they were offered an audition. Just days before the audition was due to take place, Jewry who was a friend of Johnny Theakston's walked over to his house for a rehearsal. His mother said that Johnny had become ill and was in hospital.  Two days later Jewry went back and Johnny's mother told him that her son had died at seventeen years of age. The cause of death was rheumatic fever. After the death of Theakston the group were going to call it quits. But because the BBC had responded to the audition tape that had been sent in, the band were invited to play on the Saturday Club radio pop show. Theakston's mother asked that they keep the group going as a tribute to her son as well as keeping the original name. Jewry took Theakston's place as Shane Fenton. According to an article in The Independent, Theakston's mother told Bernard Jewry that Johnny would have wanted him to take his place as Shane Fenton.

Bernard Jewry as Shane Fenton
Now with Jewry as Shane Fenton the group had become regulars on Saturday Club. Tommy Sanderson who was the MD for the show became their manager, and they got a recording contract with EMI's Parlophone label. In September 1961, their debut single "I’m a Moody Guy" was released. Spending eight weeks on the chart, the single peaked at 22. Not long after the success of the single, the group was soon touring on rock'n'roll package show events. The next single was "Walk Away" which got to no 38. They made an appearance in the Michael Winner directed film, Play It Cool, which starred Billy Fury. The next single "It's All Over Now" peaked at no 29 in April 1962. The last single, "Cindy's Birthday" made the top 20 and peaked at no 19 on 18 July 1962, spending eight weeks in the charts.

The last single for the group was "Hey Lulu" in 1964. After that the last time the group appeared together was on Saturday Club. They then broke up.

Recordings

Released recordings

Unreleased recordings
 Demo tape recorded in 1961 featuring Johnny Theakston

Members
 Johnny Theakston aka Shane Fenton - vocals
 Bernard Jewry aka Shane Fenton - vocals
 Jerry Wilcock -  lead guitar
 Mick Eyre  -  rhythm guitar
 Bill Bonney aka Bonney Oliver - bass
 Tony Hinchcliffe - drums
 George Rodda - drums
 Bobby Elliott - drums

References

English rock music groups
Musical groups established in 1960
British rock and roll music groups
1960 establishments in England